Patrick Adams may refer to:

Patrick Adams (musician) (1950–2022), American musician and producer
Patrick "Patsy" Adams, member of the Clerkenwell crime syndicate
Patrick J. Adams (born 1981), Canadian actor

See also
Pat Adams (disambiguation)
Adams (surname)